Hryhoriy (Grisha) Arshynov (1961 – 1 November 2020) was a Ukrainian Jewish civil engineer and activist. He spearheaded the restoration of the 17th-century Great Maharsha Synagogue and the Jewish cemetery in Ostroh.

Arshynov died on 1 November 2020, of complications from COVID-19.

References

1961 births
2020 deaths
Deaths from the COVID-19 pandemic in Ukraine
People from Ostroh
Ukrainian Jews
Jewish activists